Kampang , a Maring village, which is now called Kampang Khullel, is situated on the Myanmar border of the Indian state of Manipur in the Tengnoupal block of the Chandel district, India. In Maring its poetic name is Ningnakhu. It's a small hill village at an altitude of about 1400m above the sea level.

As per the Maring legend the village flourished in the New stone Age and was formally settled as Kampang in 1424 A.D.The village was frequently raided by Meitei King during 17 century and 1925–1928. It was also totally deserted during Second World War (1940–1943). The village was burnt down thrice in 1993 due to Naga-Kuki conflict. All the villagers fled to other places and again resettled in 1996.

Most of the Maring historical places are found here. the historical places are Lhouyang pal (Warriors gate), Cholomthil bung, Wapur manchem, Shangthilbung, Phomi Chin etc.
The land of Kampang is evergreen forest and Different varieties of wild animals and plants are growing in the forest of the village.

During British period a police station was set up and named as Kampang thana.

References

Villages in Chandel district